Phileas is a bus rapid transit, developed by Samenwerkingsverband Regio Eindhoven (SRE), Netherlands, along with other companies for the Cooperation Foundation Eindhoven Region (most prominently; APTS and Bombardier). It is an advanced guided bus intended to deliver tram-like public transport at a very low cost; the infrastructure is much cheaper, because of less maintenance and there are no rails and overhead lines. The project was initiated in 1998 to preserve knowledge about technology and innovation in the region and create jobs. The biggest feature of the bus is the recharging of the battery by means of electromagnetic induction; which means that the battery can be made much smaller and thus less heavy and environmentally damaging. The project started in the late 1990s to demonstrate the high technology level and technical knowledge in the Eindhoven area and to create jobs. The project has cost more than two billion euros, including infrastructure changes.

Origin of name 
Phileas is named after Phileas Fogg, the protagonist in Around the World in Eighty Days by Jules Verne because of the high speed and ability to be on time.

Navigation 

The Phileas mainly drives on a bus lane, following a pre-programmed route defined by magnets built into the road. The FROG technique used allowed driverless operation, however, for legal reasons a driver must always remain present and vigilant - the budget prevented the Phileas from being completely separated from ordinary traffic. However, the regional authority for urban transport in Eindhoven (SRE) decided to stop using the magnetic guidance system.

Safety 
The computer systems inside the Phileas buses are designed in accordance to Safety Integrity Level SIL-4. It controls the vehicle's speed and direction and has a triple-redundant, fail-safe architecture. This means that one system consists of three single-board computers in a 2-out-of-3 configuration. Each is installed in a different place in the bus, to avoid a complete system failure in the event of a vehicle collision. Every single computer obtains data from all sensors via two CAN bus connections and compares them with the other two computers' results. In the case of data mismatch, the bus is switched off and the entire system goes into a "safe state", which means that the bus stops and opens its doors.

License 

On 3 November 2005 a license & technology transfer agreement was signed between Advanced Public Transport Systems (APTS) and the Korea Railroad Research Institute (KRRI). The KRRI developed the Korean version of Phileas vehicle in May of 2011.

In December 2009, APTS, the manufacturer of the Phileas Tram signed a contract with Ballard Fuel Cells of Vancouver to supply zero emission engines for the Phileas.

The Phileas Trams are in successful operation in the Netherlands, Turkey, Korea, and Israel. They were also in use for a time in Douai, France, but persistent unreliability led to their replacement by traditional articulated buses just 4 years after their introduction.

Challenges of the Metrobus project in Istanbul 

Istanbul Metropolitan Municipality purchased 50 Phileas bi-articulated vehicles for 63,278,650€ (1,265,573€ per bus) for the Metrobus project; which was the highest order for Phileas at the time. Due to faulty design, overcrowding (as many as 300 passengers were being crammed into buses that originally had been designed for 240), challenging terrain(over 7% slopes). Weak traction axles of the buses frequently cracked and buses needed modifications to continue service. The modification cost for the stronger traction axles was quite high and it was more than 200,000€ per bus (competitor buses like Mercedes Conecto with 185 passenger capacity was sold for approximately 400,000€ at that time). Changes were made to accommodate higher passenger traffic.

One of the buses was lost to a fire on the 25 of March, 2015 at E5 road. Around 32 buses are usable and approximately 20 buses in light use (25,000km per year) due to their high operating expenses and high failure rates. Remaining buses remain parked at Edirnekapı and Hasanpaşa garages of Istanbul Metropolitan Municipality. They are currently in unusable condition and are used for a source of spare parts.

See also
 Trolleybus
 Bombardier Primove
 ABB TOSA Flash Mobility, Clean City, Smart Bus

Sources
This article incorporates parts of the Dutch Wikipedia entry, :nl:Phileas (OV)

References

External links 

 www.apts-phileas.com
 PhileasNews
    Ballard Power of Vancouver signs with APTS to power Phileas Trams
 Phileas in Istanbul (Turkish)

Bus rapid transit
Transport in the Netherlands
Fuel cell buses